The 2003 Bad Blood was the second Bad Blood professional wrestling pay-per-view (PPV) event produced by World Wrestling Entertainment (WWE). It was held exclusively for wrestlers from the promotion's Raw brand division. The event took place on June 15, 2003, at the Compaq Center in Houston, Texas. It replaced the previously annual King of the Ring PPV and marked the beginning of worldwide pay-per-views (with the exception of the older and more significant Royal Rumble, WrestleMania, SummerSlam, and Survivor Series pay-per-views) being brand exclusive (the UK-exclusive pay-per-views had been brand exclusive since Insurrextion 2002). It was the first Bad Blood held since 1997, which was originally held as an In Your House event.

The main event was a Hell in a Cell match, featuring wrestlers fighting in a ring surrounded by a steel structure. In this match, World Heavyweight Champion Triple H defeated Kevin Nash to retain his title. Two predominant bouts were featured on the undercard; in respective Singles match, Ric Flair defeated Shawn Michaels and Goldberg defeated Chris Jericho.

The event marked the second time the Hell in a Cell format was used by WWE in a Bad Blood event; the first was at the inaugural Bad Blood in 1997. The 2003 Bad Blood event grossed over $500,000 ticket sales from an attendance of 10,000. This event helped WWE increase its yearly pay-per-view revenue by $6.2 million from the previous year. When the event was released on DVD, it reached a peak position of second on Billboards DVD Sales Chart.

Production

Background
Bad Blood was first held as the 18th In Your House pay-per-view (PPV) in October 1997; In Your House was a series of monthly PPV shows first produced by the then-World Wrestling Federation (WWF, now WWE) in May 1995. The In Your House branding was retired following February 1999's St. Valentine's Day Massacre: In Your House event, as the company moved to install permanent names for each of its monthly PPVs. After six years and after the promotion had been renamed to World Wrestling Entertainment (WWE) in early 2002, WWE announced the return of Bad Blood (with the stylization being "Bad" instead of "Badd") as its own PPV event to be held on June 15, 2003, at the Compaq Center in Houston, Texas, replacing the previously annual King of the Ring PPV. It was also made exclusive to wrestlers of the Raw brand, a storyline subdivision called the brand extension in which the promotion divided its roster into two separate brands, Raw and SmackDown!, where wrestlers were exclusively assigned to perform.

Storylines

The event featured eight professional wrestling matches that involved different wrestlers from pre-existing scripted feuds, plots and storylines. Wrestlers portrayed either villains or fan favorites as they followed a series of events which built tension, leading to a wrestling match. All wrestlers were from the Raw brand – a storyline division in which WWE assigned its employees to a different program.

The main event at Bad Blood featured World Heavyweight Champion Triple H defending the title against Kevin Nash in a Hell in a Cell match. The buildup to the match began at Backlash, where Triple H nailed Kevin Nash with a sledgehammer during a six man tag team match, enabling Triple H to pin Nash for the victory. At Judgment Day, Nash defeated Triple H in a singles match via disqualification but didn't win the championship. On the May 19 episode of Raw, after Triple H successfully defended the World Heavyweight Championship against Ric Flair, Co-General Manager Steve Austin announced that due to Nash winning at Judgment Day by disqualification, Nash would face Triple H again at Bad Blood for the World Heavyweight Championship in a Hell in a Cell match. On the May 26 episode of Raw, the feud between the two wrestlers intensified when Randy Orton and Triple H attacked Nash. On the June 2 episode of Raw, Nash teamed with Shawn Michaels and The Hurricane defeated Evolution in a tag team match. After the match, Nash delivered a Jackknife powerbomb to Triple H. On the June 9 episode of Raw, Austin announced that Mick Foley would officiate the Hell in a Cell match as the guest referee.

One of the featured preliminary matches was Shawn Michaels versus Ric Flair in a singles match. The hype to this match began on the May 26 episode of Raw, where Michaels challenged Flair to a singles match for later during the show, which Flair accepted. As the match was about to take place,  Co-General Manager Eric Bischoff announced that the Flair versus Michaels match was to take place instead at Bad Blood. Later that night, Flair and Michaels lost to Triple H in a handicap match after Flair betrayed Michaels, enabling Triple H to finish him off with the Pedigree. On the June 2 episode of Raw, Michaels and Flair were in a promo, where they both discussed who was the better wrestler. Later, Michaels, along with Kevin Nash and The Hurricane defeated Evolution. The feud between Flair and Michaels enhanced on the June 9 episode of Raw. During the show, Flair and Michaels managed Randy Orton and The Hurricane, respectively; after Orton defeated The Hurricane, Flair and Michaels brawled until the program went into a commercial break.

The other featured preliminary match was Goldberg versus Chris Jericho in a singles match. The buildup to the match began on the May 12 episode of Raw, where a "mystery assailant" attempted to run Goldberg over with a vehicle, though Goldberg was able to avoid it. Later that night, Goldberg went on to defeat Christian in a Steel Cage match. On the May 19 episode of Raw, it was revealed that Lance Storm was the "mystery assailant". He, however, told Austin that he was only hired to run Goldberg over and that Jericho conspired the attack. On the May 26  episode of Raw, Jericho held a promotional in-ring segment titled The Highlight Reel. During the segment he explained that he conspired the attack because he grew jealous towards Goldberg's success in WCW, disliking Goldberg's ego and felt that since joining the WWE, he had achieved everything he had ever wanted in his career especially becoming the first WWE Undisputed Champion in history and all that was left was to defeat Goldberg and challenged him to a singles match at Bad Blood. Afterwards, Goldberg came down to the ring and accepted Jericho's challenge, and as he was about to perform a spear, Jericho sprayed Goldberg's eyes with pepper spray.

A non-physical rivalry developed between the Co-General Managers, Stone Cold Steve Austin and Eric Bischoff, who were feuding over who was the better authority. On the June 2 episode of Raw, it was announced that both men would face each other in a series of non-wrestling contests labeled the "Redneck Triathlon" at Bad Blood. The contests would include a belching contest, a pie eating contest, and a singing contest.

Event

Sunday Night Heat 
Before the event aired live on pay-per-view, Ivory faced Molly Holly on Sunday Night Heat, one of WWE's secondary TV programs. Ivory won via pinfall after a Poison Ivory.

Preliminary matches 
When the pay-per-view began, The Dudley Boyz (Bubba Ray Dudley and D-Von Dudley) faced Rodney Mack and Christopher Nowinski. The Dudleyz initially dominated the match and executed the Wassup? on Nowinski. During the match, Theodore Long, Mack and Nowinski's manager, verbally distracted D-Von, resulting in D-Von punching Long and distracting the referee. Nowinski hit Bubba with a face mask that he wore. After the referee placed his attention to the match, Nowiniski pinned Bubba for the win.

After the tag team match, Steve Austin defeated Eric Bischoff in the first contest in the "Redneck Triathlon", a belching contest.

The second match was Scott Steiner versus Test in which the winner would earn the managing services of Stacy Keibler. In the early stages, both competitors wrestled inconclusively until Steiner performed a Belly to belly suplex on Test. Test attempted to hit Steiner with a chair but the chair hit Test. Steiner performed the Steiner Flatliner to win the match and Keibler's managing services.

In the next match, Christian faced Booker T for the Intercontinental Championship. The match began with Booker executing a spinebuster. Booker T won the match by disqualification after Christian hit him with the title belt, meaning Christian retained the title.

After that, Austin faced Bischoff in the second round of the Redneck Triathlon; they have to place their face on Mae Young's crotch. Bischoff won after Austin forfeited, performing a Stunner on Young.

In the next match, Kane and Rob Van Dam faced La Résistance (René Duprée and Sylvan Grenier) for the World Tag Team Championship. This was the final pay-per-view that featured a masked Kane until the 2012 Royal Rumble. La Résistance gained the early advantage when Grenier performed a DDT on RVD. Kane and Van Dam, however, regained control when Kane chokeslammed Duprée. Towards the end, Kane brawled with Grenier and Duprée at ringside, prompting Van Dam to perform an aerial technique onto ringside. La Résistance, however, avoided the attack resulting in Van Dam landing on Kane. In the ring, while Kane was still at ringside, La Resistance performed a double spinebuster on Van Dam, proceeding into a pinfall to win the World Tag Team Championship.

Main event matches 
In the first main match, Goldberg faced Chris Jericho. In the early stages of the match, Jericho and Goldberg fought at ringside. During this tussle, Goldberg attempted to execute a spear on Jericho, who was positioned on the security barricade; Jericho, however, avoided the attack as Goldberg broke through the security barricade. Goldberg was billed as being injured, prompting Jericho to apply several submission holds on Goldberg's injured shoulder. After remaining in control for the duration of the match, Goldberg was able to counter Jericho's Walls of Jericho and execute the Jackhammer on him. Goldberg then covered Jericho for the pinfall.

In the next main match, Ric Flair faced Shawn Michaels. During the match, Michaels set up a table at ringside and positioned Flair on it. Randy Orton then came through the audience and attempted to interfere in the match, but Michaels performed Sweet Chin Music on him and put Flair through the table with a Splash. Near the end of the match, Michaels knocked the referee down and as he was about to perform Sweet Chin Music on Flair, it allowed Orton to hit Michaels with a chair. Orton then placed Flair on top of Michaels and ran out of the ring. When the referee recuperated, he saw the cover and officiated the pinfall made by Flair.

After the match, the final contest in the "Redneck Triathlon" was held. Originally it was supposed to be a singing contest, though both men agreed to change it into a pigpen contest, where the objective was to throw your opponent into a pigpen. Austin threw Bischoff into a pigpen set up near the Bad Blood entrance stage, thus Austin won the triathlon 2–1.

In the main event, Triple H faced Kevin Nash inside Hell in a Cell for the World Heavyweight Championship, with Mick Foley as the guest referee. During the start of the match, both men used a steel chair, a hammer, and the cell to their advantage. Eventually, Nash hit Triple H with a barbed wire bat many times before Triple H hit him with the steel steps. As Triple H brought a sledgehammer into the ring, Foley attempted to take it away from him, resulting in Triple H hitting Foley and Nash with a steel chair. Triple H followed up, Pedigreeing Nash. During this time, Foley had recuperated and was able to officiate the pinfall made by Triple H on Nash, thus Triple H retained the World Heavyweight Title.

Reception 
The Compaq Center had a maximum capacity of 16,285, which was reduced for Bad Blood. The event grossed US$500,000 in ticket sales from an attendance of 10,000—the maximum allowed. The event retailed as $34.95, but was offered free of charge to members of the United States armed forces who were returning from the Iraq War. Not counting the buys from military personnel, the event received 285,000 pay-per-view buys. The promotion's pay-per-view revenue was $24.7 million, which was greater than the following year's revenue of $18.5 million. Canadian Online Explorer'''s professional wrestling section rated the event a four out of ten possible points. The main event was rated a five out of ten possible points, while the standard match between Ric Flair and Shawn Michaels rated a seven and a half out of ten possible points. Pro Wrestling Torch, a newsletter and wrestling website in operation since 1987, rated the event a three and a half out of ten possible points. Both websites criticized the fact that the pay-per-view ended twenty-five minutes before the original scheduled runtime.

The event was released on DVD on August 18, 2003. The DVD was distributed by Sony Music Entertainment. The DVD debuted on Billboard''s Top Weekly DVD sales chart on September 6, 2003, reaching a peak position of second. The DVD remained on the chart for eight more weeks, ranking lower every week. The DVD finally ranked on October 25, 2003 reaching a final position of 19th. The DVD also received reviews from customers; the average customer rating from Amazon.com was a three out of five possible stars.

Aftermath 
After Bad Blood, Stone Cold Steve Austin announced an Elimination Chamber match to take place at SummerSlam for the World Heavyweight Championship. The match featured Triple H, Chris Jericho, Goldberg, Kevin Nash, Randy Orton, and Shawn Michaels; at SummerSlam, Triple H won the match to retain the World Heavyweight title. The storyline between Flair and Michaels ended when Michaels was announced as a participant in the Elimination Chamber match, in which Flair would not participate. Although their feud ended, the feud reengaged five years later in 2008. At WrestleMania XXIV, Michaels defeated Flair in a retirement match, a stipulation that only applied to Flair. As a result, Flair retired from professional wrestling.

Jericho and Goldberg continued to feud over several weeks before being announced as participants in the Elimination Chamber match, in which Goldberg eliminated Jericho. During the weeks leading up to SummerSlam, Kane would turn on Rob Van Dam after the loss of their tag titles, and his unmasking which occurred eight days after this event along with his heel turn, would lead to a No Holds Barred match between the two at SummerSlam in which Kane won, ending their team. La Résistance would engage in a feud with the Dudley Boyz, eventually a match was scheduled for SummerSlam between the two teams over the World Tag Team titles. La Résistance was able to win the match and retain the titles.

Bad Blood would be a short-lived PPV, however, as Bad Blood was discontinued after the 2004 event, which was also Raw-exclusive. The original 1997 event was notable for introducing the Hell in a Cell match, which was featured as the main event match for each Bad Blood event.

Results 

Stone Cold Steve Austin won the "Burping Contest"
Eric Bischoff won the "Pie Eating Contest" by forfeit
Stone Cold Steve Austin won the "Pig Pen Fun"

References

External links 
 Official Bad Blood (2003) website (courtesy:Archive.org)

2003 in Texas
Events in Houston
2003
Professional wrestling in Houston
2003 WWE pay-per-view events
June 2003 events in the United States
WWE Raw